Indira Gandhi National Tribal University in Amarkantak, Anuppur district, Madhya Pradesh, India was established through an Act of Parliament, Indira Gandhi National Tribal University Act, 2007, by Government of India.

History

An Act was passed in Indian parliament which was published in the Gazette of India, Part II, section I, on 20 December 2007 by the virtue of which Indira Gandhi National Tribal University Act, 52, 2007. The then M.H.R.D. minister, Shri Arjun Singh laid the foundation stone on 19 April 2008 at Amarkantak. The government of India 7 July 2008, circulated the order of appointment of the founder vice-chancellor of the university. In compliance of this order, Prof. Chandra Deo Singh took the post on 08.07.2008. It is fully granted by the government of India, through University Grant Commission.

See also
 Central University (India)

References

External links
 Indira Gandhi National Tribal University - Official website

Educational institutions established in 2007
Central universities in India
Universities and colleges in Madhya Pradesh
Anuppur district
2007 establishments in Madhya Pradesh